Syzygium polyanthum, with common names Indonesian bay leaf  or daun salam, is a species of plant in the family Myrtaceae, native to Indonesia, Indochina and Malaysia. The leaves of the plant are traditionally used as a food flavouring, and have been shown to kill the spores of Bacillus cereus.

Description 
The tree grows from lower to higher elevation up to 1400 meters. The tree can grow up to 25 meters of height. The leaf gives slightly bitter taste with astringent effect.

Uses 
The leaves may be used dried or fresh in the cuisine of Sumatra, Java, Madura, or Bali. It is an ingredient in dishes such as sayur lodeh and nasi gurih.

References

polyanthum